Percy Chapman Black (11 January 1878 – 16 September 1961) was a Canadian politician, businessman and farmer. Black served in both the Canadian House of Commons and the Nova Scotia House of Assembly.

Black was the son of J. Hiram Black and Mary Elizabeth "Libbie" Smith and was educated at Amherst College and Mount Allison University. In 1917, he married Jean F. MacDonald. He was elected to the House of Commons of Canada in 1940 as a Member of the coalition National Government to represent the riding of Cumberland. He was a member of a Special Committee on Reconstruction and Re-establishment during the 19th Canadian parliament. He was re-elected as a Progressive Conservative in 1945 and again in 1949.

Prior to his federal political experience, he was elected to the Legislative Assembly of Nova Scotia in 1925 as a Member of the Conservative Party of Nova Scotia to represent the electoral district of Cumberland County. He was appointed Nova Scotia's Minister of Highways. He died in Amherst at the age of 83.

Electoral record

References 

1878 births
1961 deaths
Members of the House of Commons of Canada from Nova Scotia
Progressive Conservative Association of Nova Scotia MLAs
Progressive Conservative Party of Canada MPs
Nova Scotia political party leaders